Bridge Number VT105-10 is a historic  bridge, carrying Vermont Route 105 across the Missisquoi River in Sheldon, Vermont.  Built in 1947 and rehabilitated in 1980, it is the state's oldest surviving four-span girder bridge.  It was listed on the National Register of Historic Places in 2018.

Description and history
Bridge Number VT105-10 is located just west of the village of Sheldon Junction, which occupies a bend on the north side of Missisquoi River in central western Sheldon. Vermont Route 105, a major roadway that roughly parallels the river in this area, crosses the river in a roughly northeast–southwest orientation. The bridge consists of four spans, mounted on concrete abutments and three concrete piers. Steel stringers support beams on which the concrete bridge deck is laid.

The bridge was built in 1947, as part of a program by the state to improve deficient pre-World War II structures.  It is the fourth road bridge to be located in roughly this location: the first was probably a wooden structure, replaced in 1887 by an iron bridge that was washed away in the state's 1927 floods.  The 1927 replace was also a steel girder bridge, but it was plagued by flooding caused by ice jams which formed between it and the nearby Central Vermont Railroad bridge.  It was built by the Marston Construction Company of Somerville, Massachusetts, and was the longest steel girder bridge in the state until 1960.

See also
 
 
 
 National Register of Historic Places listings in Franklin County, Vermont
 List of bridges on the National Register of Historic Places in Vermont

References

Bridges on the National Register of Historic Places in Vermont
National Register of Historic Places in Franklin County, Vermont
Bridges completed in 1947
Bridges in Franklin County, Vermont
Buildings and structures in Sheldon, Vermont
Steel bridges in the United States
Road bridges in Vermont
1947 establishments in Vermont